Pride Shockwave Dynamite! is the international PPV broadcast name for the mixed martial arts and kickboxing event co-promoted by the PRIDE Fighting Championships and K-1 on August 28, 2002. It was held at the Tokyo National Stadium in Tokyo, Japan. The proper name for the event was Dynamite! Biggest Mixed Martial Arts World Cup - Summer Night Fever in the National Stadium, also known shortly as Dynamite!

With a reported attendance of 91,107 (though other sources claim 71,000), it remains the highest number of attendance for a live MMA event in the sport's history. The event had a big opening ceremony, which featured Antonio Inoki dropping into the stadium by parachute. He then joined Hélio Gracie and the two "founding fathers of MMA" lit a ceremonial olympic torch together.

The actual event was marked by a "freak show fight" between 223 lb (101 kg) Antônio Rodrigo Nogueira and 350 lb (158 kg) Bob Sapp. The match had a special rule to ban knee strikes on the ground, making it a more even affair. In the first seconds of the match, Nogueira was dropped in a piledriver and got slammed on his head, despite that and Sapp's strong punches, Nogueira was able to defend himself for 19-minutes and defeat Sapp at the second round with an armbar. The other famous event was Hidehiko Yoshida vs. Royce Gracie, a "special rules match" with both fighters wearing keikogis and with limited striking allowed, billed as a "rematch" of Masahiko Kimura vs. Hélio Gracie, which had happened 50 years earlier. The match would end controversially as Gracie was caught in a sode guruma jime ("Ezekiel") chokehold from the mount. The referee felt Gracie passed out from the choke but was unable to see his face, still he awarded the victory to Yoshida by knockout. Royce stood up and protested the win, claiming he was neither unconscious nor tapped out and demanded the referees to declare a tie or rematch, the squabble soon resulted into a full a brawl between the corners of the two fighters.

Results

See also
 Pride Fighting Championships
 List of Pride Fighting Championships champions
 List of Pride Fighting events
 2002 in Pride FC
 List of K-1 events
 K-1 PREMIUM Dynamite!!

References

External links
Sherdog.com

Shockwave 2002
2002 in Tokyo
2002 in mixed martial arts
Mixed martial arts in Japan
Sports competitions in Tokyo